Run-up,  Run up or runup, may be:
Run-up (cricket), type of movement made by a bowler
Run-up (aviation), aircraft verification procedure performed just prior to take-off
The maximum height on land reached by a tsunami as it encounters the shore
The area before the main track in tumbling
"Run Up", a 2017 song by Major Lazer
Run Up (Rina Aiuchi song)
"Run Up", a 2016 song by Future from Purple Reign